Trezza Azzopardi (born 1961) is a Welsh writer, who has been shortlisted for the Booker Prize and won several other literary prizes.

Early life
Azzopardi was born in Cardiff to a Maltese father and a Welsh mother. She studied creative writing at the University of East Anglia, and currently works as a lecturer there. She also has an MA in Film and Television studies from the University of Derby.

Career
Azzopardi's novel The Hiding Place, is about Maltese immigrants living in the 1960s. Unusually for a first novel, it was shortlisted for the Booker Prize in 2000. It also won the Geoffrey Faber Memorial Prize and was shortlisted for the James Tait Black Memorial Prize. Her second novel, Remember Me, was shortlisted for the Wales Book of the Year. "Winterton Blue" was longlisted for the 2008 Wales Book of the Year. She also writes short stories and performs readings for BBC radio. Her books have been translated into 17 languages.

Azzopardi currently lives in Norwich, in the east of England.

Bibliography
The Hiding Place, Picador, 2000 
Remember Me, Picador, 2003 
Winterton Blue, Grove Press, 2007 
The Song House, Picador, 2010 

References

External links
Profile at www.contemporarywriters.com
NY times review of Winterton Blue
Profile at Writers of Wales Database

1961 births
Living people
20th-century Welsh novelists
21st-century Welsh novelists
20th-century Welsh women writers
Alumni of the University of East Anglia
Academics of the University of East Anglia
Alumni of the University of Derby
Welsh women novelists
Writers from Cardiff
Anglo-Welsh novelists
British people of Maltese descent